Teigebyen is the administrative centre in Nannestad municipality, Norway. It is located southwest of Råholt, and northwest of Gardermoen. As of 2021, its population was 3,144.

References

Villages in Akershus